Imadateiella is a genus of proturans in the family Acerentomidae.

Species
 Imadateiella murka Szeptycki, 1988
 Imadateiella saucrosi Yin, 1980
 Imadateiella shideiana (Imadaté, 1964)
 Imadateiella shiria (Imadaté, 1964)
 Imadateiella sphaerempodia Yin, 1980
 Imadateiella yosiiana Imadaté, 1961

References

Protura